Lee Mi-do (born Lee Eun-hye on 25 May 1982) is a South Korean actress.

Career 

In 2012, she also moved into the TV arena, while remaining active in her film career. Her notable TV credits include The Queen of Office (2013) and You Are My Destiny (2014).

In 2015, she was awarded at the 1st Scene Stealer Festival as one of the 22 Scene Stealers of the Year in recognition of her outstanding acting performance.

Personal life 
Lee married a non-celebrity in 2016 and had a son in 2018.

Filmography

Film

Television series

Web series

Variety show

Awards and nominations

References

External links 
 
 
 

1982 births
Living people
People from Gwangju
South Korean film actresses
South Korean television actresses
Hanyang University alumni